France was represented by Roger Bens, with the song "Femme dans ses rêves aussi", at the 1985 Eurovision Song Contest, which took place on 4 May in Gothenburg, Sweden. The song was chosen through a national final organised by broadcaster Antenne 2.

Before Eurovision

National final 
The national final was held on 31 March 1985, hosted by Patrice Laffont and Catherine Ceylac. Fourteen songs took part with the winner chosen by a panel of TV viewers who were telephoned and asked to vote on the songs.

At Eurovision 
On the night of the final Bens performed 6th in the running order, following Spain and preceding Turkey. At the close of voting "Femme dans ses rêves aussi" had received 56 points, placing France 10th of the 19 entries. The French jury awarded its 12 points to Israel.

Voting

References 

1985
Countries in the Eurovision Song Contest 1985
Eurovision
Eurovision